Taiki Sawatani is a Japanese kickboxer.

As of May 2022 he was the #10 ranked Super Flyweight in the world by Combat Press.

Kickboxing career
Sawatani's martial art experience started with full contact karate, after competing in numerous junior tournaments he switched to amateur kickboxing which led him to participate to the 2016 Japan Cup as a Shin Karate representant. He won the tournament and the event MVP award which earned him an opportunity to turn professional with the RISE organization.

Sawatani made his professional on March 5, 2017 at RISE 116 against Maiki Flyskygym. He lost the fight by unanimous decision. He traded wins and losses in his next bouts, winning by majority decision against Takuya Taira at RISE 117 and losing by unanimous decision to Yuki Kawate at RISE 118. On February 4, 2018 Sawatani faced YA-MAN at RISE 122. He lost the fight by split decision.

On August 5, 2018 Sawatani was selected to participate to the 2018 RISE Rookies Cup in the featherweight division. He defeated Silencer Higuchi by unanimous decision in a fight serving as the semifinal bout. In the final he rematched YA-MAN and defeated him by unanimous decision to win the Cup.

On February 3, 2019 Sawatani faced Teppei Tsuda at RISE 130. He won the fight by unanimous decision.

On January 13, 2020 Sawatani faced Shuto Miyazaki at RISE 136. He won the fight by majority decision.

Sawatani faced Keisuke Monguchi at RISE 143 on November 14, 2020. He lost the fight by unanimous decision, with scores of 29–28, 30–28 and 30–28.

On April 11, 2021 Sawatani entered a tournament for the vacant DEEP KICK Super Featherweight title at DEEP KICK 51. He faced Kaito in the semi final, the fight was ruled a majority draw after the first three rounds, with two judges scoring it as a 29–29 draw, while the third judge scored it 29–28 for Sawatani. Sawatani was awarded a majority decision, after an extension round was fought. The final of the tournament happened on July 4, 2021 at DEEP KICK 54 where Sawatani defeated Taisei Iwagoe by split decision to capture the vacant title.

On December 19, 2021 Sawatani faced Tasuto at Professional Shooto 2021 Vol.8 in Osaka. He lost the fight by unanimous decision.

On February 23, 2022 Sawatani made his first appearance on a Rizin show at Rizin Trigger 2 where he defeated Kota Nakgawa by unanimous decision.

On April 24, 2022 Sawatani faced Daiki Toita at RISE 157. He won the fight by unanimous decision.

Sawatani is scheduled to defend his DEEP KICK -60 kg title at DEEP KICK 62 on June 12, 2022 against Koki Oomae. He won the fight by unanimous decision.

Sawatani faced Ryoga Hirano at RISE 163 on December 10, 2022. He lost the fight by unanimous decision, with all three judges scoring the bout 29–28 for Hirano. Sawatani was knocked down with a right hook early in the first round.

Championships and accomplishments

Kickboxing
Professional
RISE
 2018 RISE Rookies Cup Featherweight Winner
DEEP KICK
 2021 DEEP KICK -60 kg Champion
Shooto
 2022 Shooto Cage Kick Championship -57.5kg Winner

Amateur
 2014 NEXT LEVEL Chushikoku Junior -60 kg Champion (1 defense)
 2016 Dageki Kakutougi Japan Cup -60 kg Winner & Event MVP

Karate
 2011 JKJO Full Contact All Japan Junior -40 kg Winner
 2011 Shin Karate K-4 GAORA Cup Winner
 2012 Ashiharakaikan Japan Cup Jr. Championship 43 kg Runner-up
 2013 Super Karate All Japan Middle School Heavyweight Winner
 2013 JKJO Full Contact All Japan Jr -65 kg Runner-up
 2014 Shin Karate All Japan K-3 Grand Prix Middle School -60 kg Winner
 2014 JKJO Full Contact All Japan Jr -65 kg Winner
 2015 Shin Karate Tokyo K-2 Tournament Lightweight Winner
 2016 Shin Karate Tokyo K-2 Tournament Lightweight Winner

Kickboxing record

|-  style="text-align:center; background:#fbb;"
| 2023-03-05 || Loss ||align=left| Takuya Taira || HOOST CUP KINGS KYOTO 11, Championship Tournament Final || Kyoto, Japan|| Decision (Majority)|| 3 ||3:00  
|-
! style=background:white colspan=9 |
|-  style="text-align:center; background:#cfc;"
| 2023-03-05 ||Win ||align=left| Hiroki Naruo || HOOST CUP KINGS KYOTO 11, Championship Tournament Semi Final || Kyoto, Japan|| Decision (Majority)|| 3 ||3:00  
|-  style="background:#fbb;"
| 2022-12-10|| Loss ||align=left| Ryoga Hirano || RISE 163 || Tokyo, Japan || Decision (Unanimous)|| 3 ||3:00 
|-  style="text-align:center; background:#cfc;"
| 2022-07-03|| Win ||align=left| Kazuhiro Matsuyama|| SHOOTO 2022 Vol.4 - Cage Kick Championship, Final || Osaka, Japan || TKO (Knee)|| 2 ||2:33 
|-
! style=background:white colspan=9 |

|-  style="text-align:center; background:#cfc;"
| 2022-07-03|| Win ||align=left| Kakeru || SHOOTO 2022 Vol.4 - Cage Kick Championship, Semi Finals || Osaka, Japan || Decision (Unanimous)|| 3 ||3:00 

|-  style="text-align:center; background:#cfc;"
| 2022-07-03|| Win ||align=left| Taiki Matsui || SHOOTO 2022 Vol.4 - Cage Kick Championship, Quarter Finals || Osaka, Japan || Decision (Majority)|| 3 ||3:00 

|-  style="text-align:center; background:#cfc;"
| 2022-06-12||Win  ||align=left| Koki Oomae || DEEP KICK 62 || Osaka, Japan ||Decision (Unanimous) || 3 || 3:00 
|-
! style=background:white colspan=9 |

|-  style="background:#cfc;"
| 2022-04-24 || Win ||align=left| Daiki Toita|| RISE 157 || Tokyo, Japan|| Decision (Unanimous)|| 3 || 3:00

|-  style="text-align:center; background:#cfc;"
| 2022-02-23|| Win ||align=left| Kota Nakagawa || Rizin Trigger 2|| Fukuroi, Japan || Decision (Unanimous) ||3 ||3:00

|-  style="text-align:center; background:#fbb;"
| 2021-12-19|| Loss || align=left| Tatsuto || Professional Shooto 2021 Vol.8 || Osaka, Japan || Decision (Unanimous) ||3 ||3:00

|-  style="text-align:center; background:#cfc;"
| 2021-07-04|| Win ||align=left| Taisei Iwagoe || DEEP☆KICK 54 - Championship Tournament Final || Osaka, Japan || Decision (Split) ||3 ||3:00 
|-
! style=background:white colspan=9 |

|-  style="text-align:center; background:#cfc;"
| 2021-04-11|| Win ||align=left| Kaito || DEEP☆KICK 51 - Championship Tournament Semi Final || Osaka, Japan || Ext.R Decision (Split)  || 4 || 3:00

|-  style="text-align:center; background:#fbb;"
| 2020-11-14 || Loss ||align=left| Keisuke Monguchi || RISE 143|| Tokyo, Japan || Decision (Unanimous) || 3 || 3:00

|-  style="text-align:center; background:#cfc;"
| 2020-01-13 || Win ||align=left| Shuto Miyazaki || RISE 136|| Tokyo, Japan || Decision (Majority) || 3 || 3:00

|-  style="text-align:center; background:#cfc;"
| 2019-04-29 || Win ||align=left| Kensei Yamakawa || RISE EVOL.3|| Tokyo, Japan || Decision (Unanimous) || 3 || 3:00

|-  style="text-align:center; background:#cfc;"
| 2019-02-03 || Win ||align=left| Teppei Tsuda || RISE 130|| Tokyo, Japan || Decision (Unanimous) || 3 || 3:00

|-  style="text-align:center; background:#cfc;"
| 2018-11-02 || Win ||align=left| YA-MAN || RISE 128 - Featherweight Rookies Cup Final|| Tokyo, Japan || Decision (Unanimous) || 3 || 3:00
|-
! style=background:white colspan=9 |

|-  style="text-align:center; background:#cfc;"
| 2018-08-05 || Win ||align=left| Silencer Higuchi || RISE ZERO - Featherweight Rookies Cup Semi Final || Tokyo, Japan || Decision (Unanimous) || 3 || 3:00

|-  style="text-align:center; background:#cfc;"
| 2018-06-03 || Win ||align=left| Aito Suenaga || RISE ZERO || Tokyo, Japan || Decision (Unanimous) || 3 || 3:00

|-  style="text-align:center; background:#fbb;"
| 2018-02-04 || Loss ||align=left| YA-MAN || RISE 122|| Tokyo, Japan || Decision (Split) || 3 || 3:00

|-  style="text-align:center; background:#fbb;"
| 2017-07-17 || Loss ||align=left| Yuki Kawate || RISE 118|| Tokyo, Japan || Decision (Unanimous) || 3 || 3:00

|-  style="text-align:center; background:#cfc;"
| 2017-05-20 || Win ||align=left| Takuya Taira || RISE 117|| Tokyo, Japan || Decision (Majority) || 3 || 3:00

|-  style="text-align:center; background:#fbb;"
| 2017-03-05 || Loss ||align=left| Maiki Flyskygym || RISE 116|| Tokyo, Japan || Decision (Unanimous) || 3 || 3:00 
|-
| colspan=9 | Legend:    

|-  style="text-align:center; background:#cfc;"
| 2016-10-22 || Win ||align=left| Keito Obinata || Amateur Dageki Kakutougi Japan Cup 2016, Final|| Tokyo, Japan ||  Decision || 2 || 2:00 
|-
! style=background:white colspan=9 |

|-  style="text-align:center; background:#cfc;"
| 2016-10-22 || Win ||align=left|  || Amateur Dageki Kakutougi Japan Cup 2016, Semi Final|| Tokyo, Japan ||  || ||

|-  style="text-align:center; background:#cfc;"
| 2016-01-31 || Win ||align=left| Yuta Masuda || NEXT☆LEVEL Chushikoku 19|| Okayama, Japan ||  KO || 2 ||

|-  style="text-align:center; background:#fbb;"
| 2015-08-15 || Loss||align=left| Kensei Kondo || K-1 Koshien 2015 Tournament, Semi Final || Tokyo, Japan || Decision (Majority)|| 1 || 2:00

|-  style="text-align:center; background:#cfc;"
| 2015-08-15 || Win||align=left| Ryoma Kobayashi || K-1 Koshien 2015 Tournament, Quarter Final || Tokyo, Japan || Ext.R Decision (Majority)|| 1 || 2:00

|-  style="text-align:center; background:#cfc;"
| 2015-08-15 || Win||align=left| Kenichi Takeuchi || K-1 Koshien 2015 Tournament, First Round || Tokyo, Japan || Decision (Split)|| 1 || 2:00

|-  style="text-align:center; background:#c5d2ea;"
| 2015-07-12 || Draw||align=left| Yudai Kitayama || HOOST CUP Spirit 6 || Kyoto, Japan || Decision ||  ||

|-  style="text-align:center; background:#cfc;"
| 2014-08-10 || Win ||align=left| Takeshi Ikeda || NJKF x NEXT LEVEL  || Okayama, Japan || Decision  || 2 || 2:00 
|-
! style=background:white colspan=9 |

|- style="text-align:center; background:#cfc;"
| 2014-04-27|| Win || align="left" | Ryoga Hirano || NEXT☆LEVEL Chushikoku 13 || Kurashiki, Japan || Decision (Unanimous)|| 2 || 2:00 
|-
! style=background:white colspan=9 |

|-  style="text-align:center; background:#cfc;"
| 2014-03-16 || Win ||align=left| Yusuke Yamada || NEXT☆LEVEL Kansai 13 || Sakai, Japan || Decision (Majority) || 2 || 2:00  
|-
| colspan=9 | Legend:

See also
 List of male kickboxers

References

1999 births
Living people
Japanese male kickboxers